Tbaeng Meanchey District is a district located in Preah Vihear Province, in northern Cambodia. According to the 1998 census of Cambodia, it consisted of six communes and had a population of 21,580. In 2008–2009, two communes—Kampong Pranak and Pal Hal—formed a new district, the Preah Vihear Municipality; according to the 2008 census, the population of the resulting four-commune district was 9,518.

The following table shows the communes in the district as of 2020.

References

Districts of Preah Vihear province